Avian Island is an island,  long and  high, lying close off the south tip of Adelaide Island, Antarctica. It was discovered by the French Antarctic Expedition, 1908–10, under Jean-Baptiste Charcot, and visited in 1948 by the Falkland Islands Dependencies Survey, who so named it because of the large number and variety of birds (avians) found there.

Birds
The island has been identified as an Important Bird Area by BirdLife International because it supports a large breeding colony of Adélie penguins (35,000 pairs), as well as imperial shags (670 pairs), south polar skuas (880 pairs), southern giant petrels (250 pairs), kelp gulls and Wilson's storm petrels.  It also holds the southernmost record of breeding brown skuas. The island is protected as Antarctic Specially Protected Area (ASPA) No.117 for its outstanding ornithological significance.

See also 
 List of Antarctic and subantarctic islands

References

Islands of Adelaide Island
Important Bird Areas of Antarctica
Seabird colonies
Antarctic Specially Protected Areas
Penguin colonies